This is a comprehensive list of songs by English electronic alternative rock band Stateless that have been officially released. Since forming in 2003, the band have released two studio albums, and one extended play (EP). This list does not contain live versions or remixes released by the band.

Original songs

Stateless